The Wind River Agency Blockhouse, also known as the Trout Creek Blockhouse, was built in 1871 on the Wind River Indian Reservation. It is one of the oldest surviving structures in Wyoming. The blockhouse was built at the suggestion of Chief Washakie as a defensive position for the local Shoshone and non-Indians against attack by Cheyenne, Northern Arapaho and Sioux raiders. After the Wyoming Territory became more stable the structure served as a jail and as a storehouse.

The Wind River Agency Blockhouse was placed on the National Register of Historic Places on December 23, 2000.

References

External links
 Wind River Agency Blockhouse at the Wyoming State Historic Preservation Office
 Wind River Agency Blockhouse at the Wyoming State Historic Preservation Office's photographic database

		
National Register of Historic Places in Fremont County, Wyoming
Buildings and structures completed in 1871
Blockhouses
Forts on the National Register of Historic Places in Wyoming
1871 establishments in Wyoming Territory
Shoshone
Wind River Indian Reservation